The Second Victory may refer to:
 The Second Victory (film), a 1987 British drama film, based on the novel
 The Second Victory (novel), a 1958 novel by Morris West